Abhimanyu is a 1997 Indian Tamil-language crime film directed by K Subash. The film stars R Parthiepan, Ravali, Raghuvaran and Geetha. It was released on 5 September 1997.

Plot

Maasilamani (Raghuvaran), a dreaded don, spreads terror around him: triggering riots, smuggling illicit liquor and drugs. The police are exasperated by Maasilamani and send Abhimanyu (R Parthiepan) to cope with Maasilamani. Abhimanyu is an incorruptible and strict Assistant Commissioner of Police who has been suspended seven times for challenging his superiors.

Abhimanyu first reforms the corrupt constables and befriends the police officer Deraviyam (Chandrasekhar). In the meantime, Manju (Ravali) fall in love with Abhimanyu. Then, Abhimanyu intercepts Maasilamani's illicit drugs shipments. At this point, Abhimanyu becomes Maasilamani's worst enemy in a very short time. Maasilamani cannot kill him directly for fear of having the police behind him. So he triggers a riot in a college to kill smoothly Abhimanyu but Abhimanyu stops the riot just in time. Maasilamani's right-hand Somu turns approver, Maasilamani henchmen manage to kill him and Deraviyam at the court. In anger, Abhimanyu wants to punish Maasilamani but he sees a familiar face in Maasilamani's house.

Abhimanyu is, in fact, an orphan. In the past, Abhimanyu's father (Anandaraj) was a heartless corrupt police inspector and Abhimanyu's mother Kausalya killed him. So Abhimanyu's sister was sent to an orphanage and the pregnant Kausalya in jail. Abhimanyu was born in jail. The person that Abhimanyu saw in Maasilamani's house is actually Ranjitha: his long-lost elder sister and Maasilamani's wife.

What transpires later forms the crux of the story.

Cast

R Parthiepan as ACP Abhimanyu IPS
Ravali as Manju
Raghuvaran as Maasilamani
Geetha as Kausalya and Ranjitha
Vijayakumar as SI Thangaraj
Chandrasekhar as Deraviyam
Anandaraj in a guest appearance
S V Ramadoss
Peeli Sivam
Ragasudha as Deraviyam's wife
S V Venkatraman
Veeraraghavan
Kalidoss
LIC Narasimhan
Lakshmi Rattan as Raghavan
Mohan V Raman as Saamy
Gowtham Sundararajan as Ganesh, Maasilamani's son
Ravikanth as Prakash, Maasilamani's son
Venky
Periya Karuppu Thevar as Basha
Vaani as Manju's mother
Lalitha
Mahanadi Shankar as Pandu
Crazy Venkatesh
Jayaprakasam as Somu
Ram
Lakshman

Soundtrack

The film score and the soundtrack were composed by Deva. The soundtrack, released in 1997, features five tracks with lyrics written by Vairamuthu, Kalidasan, Ponniyin Selvan, Mayil and Vaasan.

References

1997 films
1990s Tamil-language films
Fictional portrayals of the Tamil Nadu Police
Films scored by Deva (composer)
Films directed by K. Subash